Im Da-sol (born 21 January 1998) is a South Korean swimmer. She competed in the women's 100 m backstroke event at the 2017 World Aquatics Championships.

References

External links

1998 births
Living people
South Korean female backstroke swimmers
Place of birth missing (living people)
Swimmers at the 2018 Asian Games
Asian Games competitors for South Korea
21st-century South Korean women